Carson Cunningham (born May 7, 1977) is an American basketball coach and author. He is the current head coach of the Incarnate Word Cardinals men's basketball team.

Playing career
Cunningham was a standout basketball player at Andrean High School in Merrillville, Indiana, where he was a four-year letterwinner and a three-time first team all-area selection, as well as first team all-state selection and USA Today honorable mention All-American as a senior.

Playing his freshman season of college basketball at Oregon State, Cunningham averaged 14.9 points per game, earning a place on the 1997 Pacific 10 All-Freshman team. Cunningham would transfer back to the state of Indiana, enrolling at Purdue to play under Gene Keady and was part of the Boilermakers 1999 Sweet 16 and 2000 Elite Eight squads.

Upon graduation, Cunningham played in the Continental Basketball Association for the Gary Steelheads and Rockford Lightning from 2001 to 2005, while also playing abroad in Australia and Estonia.  While in Estonia, he led his club (Kalev/Cramo in scoring (21.5 ppg) and assists (4.8 apg).

Coaching career
Cunningham got his start in coaching at the high school ranks, taking the helm of his alma mater, Andrean High School for five seasons, where he compiled an 81–39 record, winning four sectional championships before accepting the head coaching position at NAIA institution Carroll College in Montana.

At Carroll, Cunningham inherited a Fighting Saints team that had won just two games, and in five seasons amassed a 107–52 record, including three-straight 20-win seasons, and two Frontier Conference men's basketball regular season and tournament titles, along with three trips to NAIA Men's Basketball Championships, and two quarterfinal appearances.

Cunningham was named head coach at NCAA Division I institution Incarnate Word on March 22, 2018.

Published works
Cunningham is the author of five books, which range from fiction to non-fiction on topics such as Olympic basketball, his experiences in the CBA, athletes who died in combat, the Chicago Cubs, and modern reimagining of Huckleberry Finn.

Head coaching record

NAIA

NCAA Div I

References

1977 births
Living people
American men's basketball coaches
American men's basketball players
Basketball coaches from Indiana
Basketball players from Indiana
Carroll Fighting Saints men's basketball coaches
College men's basketball head coaches in the United States
DePaul University alumni
High school basketball coaches in Indiana
Incarnate Word Cardinals men's basketball coaches
Oregon State Beavers men's basketball players
Purdue Boilermakers men's basketball players
Rockford Lightning players